The Paul Brown Federal Building and United States Courthouse, also known as Sherman U.S. Federal Building, is a historic government building in Sherman, Texas. It was built during 1906-1907 and reflects Renaissance Revival architecture. The building was listed on the National Register of Historic Places in 2000 as the US Post Office and Courthouse.  It served historically as a post office (until 1962) and continues to serve as a federal courthouse for the United States District Court for the Eastern District of Texas. In 2014, the building was renamed in honor of District Judge Paul Neeley Brown.

It is a three-story limestone-clad building on a granite base with a red clay tiled hipped roof.

See also

List of United States federal courthouses in Texas
National Register of Historic Places listings in Grayson County, Texas
Recorded Texas Historic Landmarks in Grayson County

References

External links

Renaissance Revival architecture in Texas
Government buildings completed in 1907
Buildings and structures in Grayson County, Texas
Post office buildings in Texas
Courthouses in Texas
Courthouses on the National Register of Historic Places in Texas
Post office buildings on the National Register of Historic Places in Texas
Federal courthouses in the United States
National Register of Historic Places in Grayson County, Texas